The Execution of Mary Stuart is a short film produced in 1895.  The film depicts the execution of Mary, Queen of Scots. It is the first known film to use special effects, specifically the stop trick.

The 18-second-long film was produced by Thomas Edison and directed by Alfred Clark and may have been the first film in history to use trained actors, as well as the first to use editing for the purposes of special effects. The film shows a blindfolded Mary (played by Mr. Robert L. Thomae, male actor in Shakespeare-Tradition also for female cast) being led to the execution block. The executioner raises his axe and an edit occurs during which the actor is replaced by a mannequin. The mannequin's head is chopped off and the executioner holds it in the air as the film ends.

Availability
This film is in the public domain.

See also
 List of horror films of the 1890s

External links

 
 
 
 The Execution of Mary Stuart for download
 "Alfred Clark, Narrative and Special Effects Pioneer"
 

1895 films
1895 horror films
1890s American films
American black-and-white films
American silent short films
Films set in Tudor England
Films about Mary, Queen of Scots
Films about capital punishment
Films set in Northamptonshire
Articles containing video clips
American horror films
Films produced by Thomas Edison
1895 short films
Decapitation
Silent horror films